The 2005 Birmingham tornado was one of the strongest tornadoes recorded in  Great Britain in nearly 30 years, occurring on 28 July 2005 in the suburbs of Birmingham. It formed on a day when thunderstorms were expected to develop across the Midlands and eastern England. The tornado struck at approximately 14:30 BST in the Sparkbrook area and also affected King's Heath, Moseley and Balsall Heath as it carved a 7 kilometre-long path through the city.

Background
While England has more reported tornadoes, relative to its land area, than any other country, the vast majority are weak. The strongest recorded tornado in the country struck Portsmouth on 14 December 1810, with a T8 (F4) rating.

In Birmingham, a tornado struck the city in 1931, killing one woman and severely damaging several houses. On 23 November 1981, during a record-breaking nationwide tornado outbreak, two tornadoes touched down within the Birmingham city limits – in Erdington and Selly Oak – with six tornadoes touching down within the boundaries of the wider West Midlands county.

Effects and damage
The main effects of the July 2005 tornado in Birmingham were felt on Ladypool Road, which bore the brunt of the damage. Ladypool Primary School was extensively damaged and lost its distinctive Martin & Chamberlain tower. The adjacent St Agatha's Church also suffered some damage. Christ Church (consecrated in 1867), on the corner of Dolobran Road and Grantham Road in Sparkbrook, was also damaged and has now been demolished.

There were no fatalities, although there were approximately 19 injuries, three of which were reported to be serious. The tornado uprooted an estimated 1,100 trees, removed the roofs of buildings, picked up and deposited cars and caused other damage during its short existence. The total cost of damage was estimated at £40 million.

Second tornado in October
Following this came widespread flooding across the region which brought havoc to Birmingham.

See also
List of tornadoes and tornado outbreaks
List of European tornadoes and tornado outbreaks
Climate of the United Kingdom
1981 United Kingdom tornado outbreak

References

External links 
BBC Birmingham Site
BBC Birmingham - Pictures by the public
Birmingham City Council tornado page
The Balti Triangle Back in Business (photos) 
Forward - Birmingham City Council newspaper 
ITN News report on the Birmingham tornado https://www.youtube.com/watch?v=iPtdu6zLh8E

History of Birmingham, West Midlands
Tornadoes in the United Kingdom
Tornadoes of 2005
Birmingham Tornado, 2005
Weather events in England
2000s in Birmingham, West Midlands
Disasters in the West Midlands (county)
July 2005 events in the United Kingdom